The 1997 German Athletics Championships were held at the Waldstadion in Frankfurt on 27–29 June 1997.

Results

Men

Women 

 : Wind assisted

References 
 Results source: 

1997
German Athletics Championships
German Athletics Championships